Carrollton is a town in and the second county seat of Carroll County, Mississippi, United States, which is within the Mississippi Delta. The population was 190 at the 2010 census, down from 408 in 2000. Centrally located in the county, the town is part of the Greenwood, Mississippi micropolitan area. The first county seat, Vaiden, Mississippi, was founded in the eastern part of the county during its early settlement.

History
The town was developed as the county seat and trading center for rural Carroll County, which was devoted to  cotton agriculture and plantations in the antebellum era.

The town was the location of the Carroll County Courthouse Massacre, in 1886.

Geography
Carrollton is located in central Carroll County on the south side of Big Sand Creek, a tributary of the Yalobusha River.

The town borders North Carrollton, which is located directly to the north across the creek. Mississippi Highways 17 and 35 pass through the center of Carrollton, leading north into North Carrollton. Many residents of Carrollton and North Carrollton consider the towns a single entity, simply referred to as Carrollton.

Highway 35 continues north  to Holcomb; in the other direction, it leads southeast  to Vaiden, the other county seat. Highway 17 leads south  to Lexington. U.S. Route 82, a four-lane divided highway, passes through the southern part of Carrollton, leading east  to Winona and west  to Greenwood.

Climate
The climate in this area is characterized by hot, humid summers and generally mild to cool winters.  According to the Köppen Climate Classification system, Carrollton has a humid subtropical climate, abbreviated "Cfa" on climate maps.

Demographics

2020 census

As of the 2020 United States census, there were 423 people, 73 households, and 43 families residing in the town.

2000 census
As of the census of 2000, there were 408 people, 85 households, and 62 families residing in the town. The population density was 522.0 people per square mile (202.0/km2). There were 99 housing units at an average density of 126.7 per square mile (49.0/km2). The racial makeup of the town was 50.00% White and 50.00% African American. Hispanic or Latino of any race were 0.49% of the population.

There were 85 households, out of which 24.7% had children under the age of 18 living with them, 57.6% were married couples living together, 10.6% had a female householder with no husband present, and 25.9% were non-families. 24.7% of all households were made up of individuals, and 17.6% had someone living alone who was 65 years of age or older. The average household size was 2.27 and the average family size was 2.65.

In the town, the population was spread out, with 8.3% under the age of 18, 27.9% from 18 to 24, 34.3% from 25 to 44, 18.1% from 45 to 64, and 11.3% who were 65 years of age or older. The median age was 31 years. For every 100 females, there were 312.1 males. For every 100 females age 18 and over, there were 340.0 males.

The median income for a household in the town was $48,750, and the median income for a family was $53,333. Males had a median income of $21,667 versus $23,750 for females. The per capita income for the town was $13,536. About 6.9% of families and 6.5% of the population were below the poverty line, including 8.3% of those under age 18 and 10.6% of those age 65 or over.

Education
The town of Carrollton is served by the Carroll County School District. Its schools are Marshall Elementary School and J. Z. George High School in North Carrollton.

It is also served by Carroll Academy, a private school in Carrollton.

Notable people

Benajah Harvey Carroll, Baptist pastor, theologian, teacher, and author
G. L. Crockett, Musician
Basil LeFlore, Governor of the Choctaw nation
Robert LeFlore, 11-term Illinois state legislator
Billy Nichols, musician
Willie Norwood, professional basketball player
John A. Pittman, Korean War hero
Elizabeth Spencer, writer

Notes

References

External links

 Town of Carrollton official website
 Carroll County, official website

Towns in Carroll County, Mississippi
Towns in Mississippi
County seats in Mississippi
Greenwood, Mississippi micropolitan area